聖母 (simplified 圣母) , literally "holy mother", is the Chinese for:
a goddess in Chinese folk religion, see Chinese_folk_religion#Mother_goddess_worship
an honorific title for the mother of an emperor, see Empress_dowager#Chinese_empresses_dowager
a title of Wu Zetian
a title of the Blessed Virgin in Chinese Christianity
in Chinese internet slang, a sarcastic, possibly pejorative term for "bleeding-heart" politically correct women, see Baizuo

See also
Mother goddess
Holy Mother (disambiguation)